Jim Troy (born January 21, 1953) is a retired American professional ice hockey player, coach, and general manager as well as a former professional wrestling executive and boxing manager and promoter.

Hockey career
Over three seasons, from 1975 to 1978, Troy played 68 regular season games in the World Hockey Association with the New England Whalers and Edmonton Oilers. He then played in the American Hockey League for the Philadelphia Firebirds and New Haven Nighthawks. In 1980 he became an assistant coach with the Nighthawks.

WWF
Troy was hired by Vince McMahon to be the head coach and general manager of the Cape Cod Buccaneers for their inaugural season 1981-82 season in the Atlantic Coast Hockey League. In their only season in the ACHL, the Buccaneers went 17-21-1. After the Buccaneers folded, Troy remained with McMahon as senior vice president of Titan Sports, Inc. In 1983, he helped McMahon purchase the WWF from his father, Vince McMahon, Sr. Later that year, Troy reached an agreement with USA to replace Southwest Championship Wrestling on the network's schedule. The deal allowed the WWF to be broadcast to 24 million homes a week (29% of homes that had cable). In 1987, he helped convince McMahon to test the pay-per-view market. He resigned from the company in 1989, following a physical altercation with wrestler Koko B. Ware. on a European tour.

Boxing
After leaving the WWF, Troy worked as a boxing manager and promoter. Fighters he managed included Ebo Elder, Robert Allen, and Jason Pires. He also served as an executive producer for Mike Jarrell Promotions and ESPN.

References

External links

1953 births
Living people
American men's ice hockey forwards
Beauce Jaros players
Binghamton Dusters players
Cape Cod Buccaneers players
Edmonton Oilers (WHA) players
Erie Blades players
New England Whalers players
New Haven Nighthawks players
Rhode Island Reds players
Ice hockey people from Massachusetts
WWE executives
Boxing managers
American boxing promoters
Ice hockey coaches from Massachusetts
Ice hockey people from Boston